The following is a list of state highways in Arkansas. The state does not use a numbering convention. Generally the two-digit odd numbered highways run north–south with a few exceptions; and even-numbered two-digit state highways run east–west with a few exceptions.

Arkansas has long had a stigma of poor roads, dating from the "Arkansas Roads Scandal" playing a prominent role in state politics through the 1920s and 1930s, periodic allegations of corruption, waste, and fraud, and a long-running struggle to adequately fund the operation, maintenance and expansion of a large highway system serving a rural state.

The state has received the designation of "worst roads in America" from several publications throughout the 1990s and into the 2000s, with Interstate 30 and Interstate 40 often ranking particularly poorly among truckers. Rankings improved until a large construction plan was completed on I-40.

A 2000 survey cited the poor condition of rural interstates, as well as narrow lanes on rural state highways, as areas of concern, ranking Arkansas 47th of the 50 states. A 2011 study found Arkansas's rural highways fourth-most, and the state's roads overall the 16th most deadly.



State highways

Institutional routes

See also

 1926 Arkansas state highway numbering

Notes

References

Sources

External links
Arkansas Department of Transportation
IDriveArkansas.com, Interactive map showing travel conditions throughout Arkansas

State